Articerodes ohmomoi is a rove beetle discovered in Thailand in 2008. It was named for Dr. Sadahiro Ohmomo, who collected the holotype for the species. It is closely related to Articerodes jariyae and Articerodes thailandicus, discovered during the same study.

References

Clavigeritae
Insects of Thailand